The voiced linguolabial plosive or stop is a type of consonantal sound used in some spoken languages.

Features 

Features:

Occurrence

References

Linguolabial consonants
Pulmonic consonants
Plosives
Voiced oral consonants